Hans-Joachim Riecke or Hans-Joachim Ernst Riecke (20 June 1899 – 11 August 1986) was a German Nazi politician and Gruppenführer in the SS. During World War II Riecke was the State Secretary (Staatssekretär) to Herbert Backe, the Reichsminister of Food and Agriculture. He was Backe's accomplice in planning and implementing the Hunger Plan which resulted in the death by starvation of millions of people in the Soviet Union.

Biography
Riecke was born in Dresden, Germany. He studied agriculture at the University of Leipzig and graduated in 1925 with a degree in farming. He joined the Nazi Party in June 1925. From 1925 Riecke worked in the Chamber of Agriculture of Westphalia in Münster, most recently as head of the Department of Agriculture. In 1929, he was the leader of the Sturmabteilung (SA) in Münster. From 1931 to 1933, he worked in Gau Westphalia-North as an agricultural advisor and an adjutant to the Gauleiter, Alfred Meyer. After the Nazi seizure of power, he served briefly (1 April - 23 May 1933) as the head of government (as Reichskommissar) of the Free State of Schaumburg-Lippe. From 23 May 1933 to 1 February 1936 he was Minister of State (Staatsminister) of the Free State of Lippe under Meyer who was the Reichsstatthalter (Reich Governor). In 1936 he became a  Department Head (Ministerialdirektor) to Herbert Backe in the Reich Ministry of Food and Agriculture.

During World War II he was the most important accomplice of Herbert Backe in developing and administering the Hunger Plan. Riecke headed the agricultural section of the Economic Staff East of the Four Year Plan, whose guidelines appeared on 23 May 1941 and acknowledged that mass starvation would occur among the Slavic civilian populations under German occupation by directing all food supplies to the German home front and the Wehrmacht deployed on the Eastern Front. Riecke simultaneously served as head of the "Chief Group for Agriculture" in the Reich Ministry for the Occupied Eastern Territories to better coordinate agricultural policies in the East. On 1 June 1942, Riecke was named acting State Secretary (Staatssekretär) in the Agriculture Ministry; on 17 July 1944 he became permanent State Secretary. In the same year he switched from the SA to the SS, receiving the rank of SS-Gruppenführer, effective 10 October.

After Hitler's suicide, Riecke continued in his position in the Flensburg government under Karl Dönitz. Riecke was arrested on 23 May 1945 and interned until March 1949. At the Nuremberg trials he testified in April 1946 at the trial of Alfred Rosenberg as a defence witness in favour of the accused. During the Ministries Trial, one of the subsequent Nuremberg Trials, he appeared in February 1948 as a witness for the prosecution against Richard Walther Darré, Backe's predecessor as Reichsminister for Agriculture. In denazification proceedings, Riecke was classified as "Group II" (Offenders) and on 30 October 1950 was sentenced to 2 years imprisonment but was released on the basis of time served. An appeal was denied on 16 November 1952, but a request for clemency to the state of Hesse resulted in his reclassification as "Group IV" (Followers) after payment of a 500 Reichsmark fine, effective 1 July 1954. 
 
From 1952 to 1970 Riecke was an official and head of the Economics Department of the Alfred C. Toepfer Company, which operated, among other areas, in global trade in agricultural products, particularly grain. After that, Riecke was vice executive until 1976 of the Alfred Toepfer Stiftung F.V.S., which also provided substantial financial support to the Toepfer company, and from 1976 to his death in 1986 an honorary member of this Foundation.

See also
List SS-Gruppenführer

Sources

Notes

Bibliography
 Wigbert Benz: Hans-Joachim Riecke, NS-Staatssekretär. Vom Hungerplaner vor, zum "Welternährer" nach 1945. Wissenschaftlicher Verlag Berlin, Berlin 2014, .
 Alex J. Kay: Exploitation, Resettlement, Mass Murder: Political and Economic Planning for German Occupation Policy in the Soviet Union, 1940-1941. (= Studies on War and Genocide, Vol. 10) Berghahn Books, New York, Oxford 2006, .

1899 births
1986 deaths
German agronomists
Nazi Party officials
Nazi Party politicians
People from Dresden
SS-Gruppenführer
Sturmabteilung personnel
20th-century Freikorps personnel
20th-century agronomists